Alassane Thioub (born 16 October 1955) is a Senegalese judoka. He competed in the men's half-heavyweight event at the 1980 Summer Olympics.

References

1955 births
Living people
Senegalese male judoka
Olympic judoka of Senegal
Judoka at the 1980 Summer Olympics
Place of birth missing (living people)